Hero Bhanga is a village within the jurisdiction of the Canning police station in the Canning I CD block in the Canning subdivision of the South 24 Parganas district in the Indian state of West Bengal.

Geography

Demographics
As per 2011 Census of India, Hero Bhanga had a total population of 7,339.

Transport
A stretch of a local road links Hero Bhanga to the Baruipur-Canning Road.

Canning railway station is located nearby.

Healthcare
Ghutiari Sharif Block Primary Health Centre at Ghutiari Sharif, with 10 beds, is the major government medical facility in the Canning I CD block.

References 

Villages in South 24 Parganas district